Yagit is a 2014 Philippine television drama series broadcast by GMA Network. It premiered on the network's Afternoon Prime line up from October 13, 2014 to July 24, 2015, replacing Dading.

Mega Manila ratings are provided by AGB Nielsen Philippines.

Series overview

Episodes

October 2014

November 2014

December 2014

January 2015

February 2015

March 2015

April 2015

May 2015

June 2015

July 2015

References

Lists of Philippine drama television series episodes